Judayda, also transliterated as Jdaydeh,  is a Syrian village located in Al-Janudiyah Nahiyah in Jisr al-Shughur District, Idlib.  According to the Syria Central Bureau of Statistics (CBS), Judayda had a population of 407 in the 2004 census. It is an Orthodox Christian village.

References 

Populated places in Jisr al-Shughur District
Christian communities in Syria